Duck and Cover were a multinational avant-rock septet founded in West Germany in 1983, comprising Chris Cutler (UK), Heiner Goebbels (GER), and Alfred Harth (GER) from Cassiber; Tom Cora (US) and Fred Frith (UK) from Skeleton Crew; Dagmar Krause (GER) from Art Bears; and George Lewis (US) from the ICP Orchestra. The ensemble was initially commissioned for the 1983 Moers Festival at the request of festival director Burkhard Hennen to Alfred Harth.

Duck and Cover performed a 45-minute musical piece entitled "Berlin Programme" at the Berlin Jazz Festival in October 1983 in West Berlin, and again at the Festival of Political Songs in East Berlin in February 1984. Both performances were recorded and broadcast nationally. An edited version of the East Berlin broadcast was released in September 1985 on one side of the Rē Records Quarterly Vol.1 No.2 LP record.

Name
Duck and Cover's name was taken from the duck and cover drill taught to school children in the United States between the late 1940s and the 1980s in the event of a nuclear attack. The escalation of Cold War hostilities between the United States and the Soviet Union in the early 1980s and the Europe-wide protests in 1983 at the deployment of Cruise, Pershing II and SS-20 missiles were the motivation behind the formation of this ensemble and its music. Before the second performance of the "Berlin Programme" in East Berlin, Heiner Goebbels made the following statement:

"Berlin Programme"
The "Berlin Programme" performance was based on a structure which had been designed by Alfred Harth and written by Heiner Goebbels using fragments of compositions by Heiner Goebbels/Alfred Harth (Duo Goebbels/Harth), Cutler/Frith (Art Bears) and Bertolt Brecht/Hanns Eisler plus improvisation by all members of the ensemble.

The first performance was at the Berlin Jazz Festival in West Berlin on 29 October 1983. The 45-minute show was recorded by West Berlin Radio (RIAS) and broadcast on 28 August 1984. The songs used were:
"Rats and Monkeys" (Cutler/Frith)
"The Song of Investment Capital Overseas" (Cutler/Frith)
"Kein Kriegsspielzeug Für Jonathan" (Duo Goebbels/Harth)
"Easter Day 1935" (Brecht/Eisler)
"Dunkle Wolk" (Duo Goebbels/Harth)
"Und Ich Werde Nicht Mehr Sehen" (Brecht/Eisler)
"Freedom" (Cutler/Frith)

The second performance took place at the Berliner Ensemble in East Berlin on 16 February 1984, and was recorded and mixed by radio engineers from Rundfunk der DDR directly onto ¼" master tape. This 40-minute performance was broadcast across East Germany later in February 1984, and contained the following pieces:
"3000 Explosions"
"Dark Cloud" (Duo Goebbels/Harth)
"Walls are Loosening" (Cutler/Frith)
"Rats and Monkeys" (Cutler/Frith)
"Pause"
"Easter Day 1935" (Brecht/Eisler)
"Kein Kriegspielzeug Für Jonathan" (Duo Goebbels/Harth)
"The Song of Investment Capital Overseas" (Cutler/Frith)
"The Address"
"Fragments"
"On Suicide" (Brecht/Eisler)
"Und Ich Werde Nicht Mehr Sehen" (Brecht/Eisler)

To prepare the "Berlin Programme" for the Rē Records Quarterly LP release, Cutler and Goebbels edited the East Berlin radio recording with "repeated listening in mind". They were unable to alter the mixes but shortened the recording to 28-minutes, omitting the closing Art Bears song, "Freedom". Cutler remarked that notwithstanding the edits, the LP version "... does, I think, still convey that contradiction we tried to express at the concert: between the distracting and draining pressure of contemporary life ..."

Members
Tom Cora – cello, bass guitar, cassettes, electrics
Chris Cutler – drums, electrics
Fred Frith – guitar, bass guitar, cassettes
Heiner Goebbels – piano, synthesizer, guitar, cassettes
Alfred Harth – tenor saxophone, bass clarinet, trumpet, trombone, mouthpieces
Dagmar Krause – vocals
George Lewis – trombone, mouthpieces

Discography
Rē Records Quarterly Vol.1 No.2 (LP, Recommended Rē 0102, UK, 1985)
Side 1: "Berlin Programme" (Brecht/Eisler, Cutler/Frith, Duo Goebbels/Harth, Cora, Krause, Lewis) – 27:44
This is the original edit of Duck and Cover's live performance of the "Berlin Programme" at the Berliner Ensemble in East Berlin on 16 February 1984.

Re-issues
RēR Quarterly Selections from Vol.1 (CD, Recommended RēR QCD1, UK, 1991)
Track 2: "Berlin Programme" (Brecht/Eisler, Cutler/Frith, Duo Goebbels/Harth, Cora, Krause, Lewis) – 27:41
This is a minor edit of the original "Berlin Programme" release on Rē Records Quarterly Vol.1 No.2.
The Art Box (6xCD, Recommended RēR ABox, UK, 2004)
Disc 6, track 2: "The Song of Investment Capital Overseas" (Cutler/Frith) – 3:42
This is an extract from the "Berlin Programme" of the Art Bears song.

See also
History of Berlin

References

External links

Duck and Cover. Chris Cutler home page

German experimental musical groups
Musical groups established in 1983
Musical groups disestablished in 1984
Chris Cutler
Fred Frith